Pension Schöller (English:The Schöller Boardinghouse) is a German comedy play by Wilhelm Jacoby and Carl Laufs which was first performed in 1890. The play was originally performed at Wallner Theatre in Berlin and quickly became a staple of German comic literature.

Film adaptations
The play has been turned into films on three occasions, in 1930, 1952 and 1960, all of them directed by George Jacoby. There have also been several television versions.

References

Bibliography
 Grange, William. Historical Dictionary of German Theater. Scarecrow Press, 2006.

Plays by Wilhelm Jacoby
Plays by Carl Laufs
1890 plays
German plays adapted into films